Silmo Mocuba, usually known simply as Silmo Mocuba, is a traditional football (soccer) club based in Mocuba, Mozambique.

Stadium
The club plays their home matches at Silmo Mocuba Stadium, which has a maximum capacity of 5,000 people.

References

Football clubs in Mozambique